Powder-puff plant is a common name for several plants and may refer to:

 Calliandra, genus in the family Fabaceae
 Mimosa strigillosa, perennial ground cover in the family Fabaceae
 Sorocephalus, genus of small shrubs in the family Proteaceae
 Tillandsia tectorum